Andreas Tobiasson (born 14 December 1983) is a Swedish former professional footballer who played as a defender.

Club career
Tobiasson came to the club from Jonsereds IF in 2004, he left after several years GAIS and joined to Vasalunds IF. He played for Ljungskile SK between 2010 and 2011

International career
Tobiasson has made one U-21 match for Sweden.

References

1983 births
Living people
Association football defenders
Swedish footballers
Sweden under-21 international footballers
Jonsereds IF players
GAIS players
Vasalunds IF players
Ljungskile SK players
Superettan players
Allsvenskan players